Kinksize Session is the first EP released by the Kinks in the UK in 1964, a month after their debut LP. The tracks were all exclusive to this release and it includes some original compositions.

Recording
Despite the title, only three of the tracks were recorded in a single session (18 October 1964) with "I Gotta Go Now" having already been recorded (believed to be at the same session as single "All Day and All of the Night" on 23 September).

Release
Kinksize Session was released in the UK, Australia, and New Zealand in 1964. In the US, the tracks were included on the Kinks-Size album in 1965. "Louie Louie" was included on the UK compilation album Sunny Afternoon in 1967 but the other tracks remained unavailable elsewhere.

The EP was made available on CD in 1990 as part of The EP Collection boxed set. All four tracks were included as bonus tracks on the 2004 reissue of the Kinks' debut album.

The follow-up EP, Kinksize Hits simply compiled the hit singles "You Really Got Me" and "All Day and All of the Night" along with their respective B-sides. Their next EP of original material would be 1965's Kwyet Kinks.

Track listing
All tracks composed by Ray Davies; except where indicated.

Side one
"Louie Louie" (Richard Berry)2:57
"I Gotta Go Now"2:54

Side two
"I've Got That Feeling"2:45
"Things Are Getting Better"1:57

Personnel 
According to band researcher Doug Hinman:

The Kinks
Ray Davieslead vocals, piano , harmonica 
Dave Daviesbacking vocals, electric guitar
Pete Quaifebacking vocals, bass
Mick Avorydrums

Additional musician and production
Bob Augerengineer
Nicky Hopkinspiano 
Shel Talmy producer

Charts

Notes

References

Sources 

1964 EPs
Albums produced by Shel Talmy
The Kinks EPs
Pye Records EPs